Elena Starr Nesler (August 2, 1952 – December 26, 2008) was an American woman known for shooting and killing, in a court room, the man accused of molesting her son. Her case was reported on throughout the United States, and the Associated Press wrote that the incident "sparked a national debate about vigilantism".

Killing of Driver
Nesler made headlines on April 2, 1993 when she killed Daniel Mark Driver, who had been accused of sexually abusing five boys, including Nesler's then-six-year-old son, William, in the courtroom of the Jamestown Justice Court. She fired five shots into Driver's head, killing him instantly. Driver had previous convictions for child molestation. 

According to Jon Thurber of the Los Angeles Times, the finding that Nesler was under the influence of methamphetamine when she killed Driver caused the "sympathetic portrait" of herself portrayed by her defense team to "erode". "She served 3 1/2 years as her case wended its way through trial and appeal before she pleaded guilty to voluntary manslaughter," a plea bargain that released her in 1997.

Later life and death
In 2002, she was convicted of selling and possessing methamphetamine. She was released from a woman's facility near Chowchilla, California in 2006. She died nearly three years later in December 2008.  Nesler died at age 56 of breast cancer at the UC Davis Medical Center.

Legacy
The television film Judgment Day: The Ellie Nesler Story was based upon the incident, starring Christine Lahti as Nesler.

See also
Gary Plauché
Marianne Bachmeier

References

External links
"Son of vigilante mother now subject of California murder probe, manhunt", Associated Press, July 29, 2004
"Ellie Nesler again out of prison" , Chris Nichols, Sonora Union-Democrat, June 5, 2006

1952 births
2008 deaths
20th-century criminals
21st-century American criminals
American people convicted of drug offenses
American prisoners and detainees
American vigilantes
Deaths from cancer in California
Deaths from breast cancer
Extrajudicial killings
People from Tuolumne County, California
Place of birth missing
Prisoners and detainees of California
American people convicted of manslaughter
Vigilantism against sex offenders